Machine II Machine is the fifth studio album by the German female hard rock singer Doro Pesch. The album was released in March 1995 and mixed by Kevin Shirley and Greg Smith. It is the most mainstream oriented album of the German singer to date, thanks to the production of Jack Ponti (Bon Jovi, Alice Cooper, Baton Rouge) and the collaboration of musicians and authors coming from pop, country and even Latin music. The lyrics break new ground for Doro, as many of the songs deal with erotic themes. The last track is a remix done by members of the German industrial metal band Die Krupps, who worked with Doro on her next albums. The limited edition of the album contains the bonus track "Tie Me Up (Hard & Fast mix)".

The album peaked at position No. 33 in the German Longplay chart.

Track listing

Personnel
Band members
 Doro Pesch – vocals
 Jack Ponti – guitars, bass, backing vocals
 Greg Smith – guitars, bass, drums, keyboards, backing vocals
 Andres Levin – guitars, bass
 Camus Celli – drums
 Harold Frazee – keyboards, backing vocals
 Nick Douglas – bass, backing vocals
 Johnny Dee – drums
 John Pfeiffer – guitars, backing vocals
 Elliot Easton – guitars, backing vocals
 Earl Slick – guitars

Production
 Nelson Ayers – engineer
 Dennis Bourke – engineer, associate producer
 Camus Celli – producer
 Harold Frazee – associate producer
 Mike Goldberg – engineer
 Ted Jensen – mastering
 Christine Kozler – assistant engineers
 Andres Levin – producer
 Garth "Gaff" Micheal – assistant engineer
 Jack Ponti – engineer, producer
 Kevin Shirley – mixing, associate producer
 Greg Smith – mixing, associate producer
 Keith Tackel – assistant engineer
 Steve Weinkam – assistant engineer

References

External links
American site
"Ceremony" video clip
"In Freiheit Stirbt Mein Herz" video clip

Doro (musician) albums
1995 albums
Vertigo Records albums